Renacer may refer to:

 "Renacer" (song), a 1990 single by Gloria Estefan
 Renacer (Dark Latin Groove album)
 Renacer (Pablo Ruiz album), 2010
 Renacer...Special Edition, an album by Ana Gabriel
 Renacer (Senses Fail album), 2013